Eino Puri (born 7 May 1988) is an Estonian professional footballer who plays as a midfielder for Trysil FK.

Club career
Puri began his professional career with Tartu SK 10 before signing for FCI Levadia Tallinn in 2005. From 2011 to 2016 he played for Nõmme Kalju.

International career
Puri was capped by Estonia at under-19, under-21 and under-23 level. He made his debut for the senior national team on 29 May 2009 in a friendly match against Wales, coming on as a late substitute and earned a total of 5 caps for the national side.

Personal life
Puri is one of three triplets: his brother, Sander Puri, is also a footballer and his sister, Kadri Puri, is a volleyball player.

Honours
 FCI Levadia Tallinn
 Estonian Top Division: 2006, 2007, 2008, 2009
 Runners Up: 2005
 Estonian Cup: 2005, 2007
 Estonian Supercup
 Runners Up: 2005, 2007, 2008
 Nõmme Kalju FC
 Estonian Top Division: 2012
 Estonian Cup: 2015

References

External links
Eino Puri at the Estonian Football Association (in Estonian)
Profile on Soccernet.ee
Eino Puri at NFF

1988 births
Triplets
Sportspeople from Tartu
Living people
Estonian footballers
Association football midfielders
Estonia international footballers
Estonia under-21 international footballers
Estonian expatriate footballers
Meistriliiga players
FCI Levadia Tallinn players
Viljandi JK Tulevik players
Nõmme Kalju FC players
Liga I players
FC Botoșani players
Expatriate footballers in Romania
Estonian expatriate sportspeople in Romania
Tartu JK Tammeka players
Expatriate footballers in Norway
Estonian expatriate sportspeople in Norway